Janice Beard (also known as Janice Beard 45 WPM), is a 1999 film directed by Clare Kilner. It stars Eileen Walsh, Rhys Ifans and Patsy Kensit. It was nominated for an awards in 1999, 2000 and 2002.

Cast
Eileen Walsh as Janice Beard
Rhys Ifans as Sean
Patsy Kensit as Julia
Sandra Voe as Mimi
David O'Hara as O'Brien
Frances Grey as Violet
Zita Sattar as Jane 
Amelia Curtis as June 
Mossie Smith as Dolores 
Eddie Marsan as Mr. Tense 
Perry Fenwick as Mr. Button

References

External links

1999 films
Films directed by Clare Kilner
British comedy films
1999 comedy films
1999 directorial debut films
1990s English-language films
1990s British films